"Susan's House" is a song by American rock band Eels. It was released as the third single from their 1996 debut album, Beautiful Freak.

Content 
In his autobiography, Mark Oliver Everett states that Susan "wasn't a crazy girl, a rare exception at the time". Her house was in Pasadena, not a walkable distance from where Everett lived at the time. The song focuses on the problems in the area he walks through as he goes over to visit her. By the time of recording the song, he and Susan had already been apart a few years. Susan is also the subject of the song "Beautiful Freak" from the same album.

The song samples the piano introduction from the 1974 Gladys Knight & the Pips track "Love Finds Its Own Way", written by Jim Weatherly, who, along with Jim Jacobsen, is credited as co-writing Susan's House on both the original single and the album.

Release 

"Susan's House" reached number 9 in the UK Singles Chart, the group's highest-charting single in the country to date.

Track listing

Charts

References 

Eels (band) songs
1997 singles
Song recordings produced by Mark Oliver Everett
Songs written by Mark Oliver Everett
Songs written by Jim Weatherly